The Turkish Cycling Federation (TBF)  is the national governing body of cycle racing in Turkey. Founded in 1923, its headquarters is located in Ulus quarter of Ankara. Current president of TBF is Emin Müftüoğlu.

The TBF is a member of the UCI and the UEC.

History
The first bicycle competition held in Turkish history was organized by ethnic Armenian Leon effendi and Papazyan in 1910-1912 in the city of Salonica.

Eventually, these Cycling competitions got sponsored by the Fenerbahçe sports club which organized races from the Fenerbahçe neighborhood, then Maslak, and Bakırköy.

The Turkish Cycling Federation was eventually established in 1923. Its first national competition was held in 1927 which started from Taksim and ended in Bulgaria.

Events
The federation organizes following cycling events every year, which are part of UCI Europe Tour and are rated with 2.2:
 Presidential Cycling Tour of Turkey
 Tour of Alanya in Alanya, Antalya Province (since 2010)
 Tour of Cappadocia in Cappadocia, Nevşehir Province (since 2011)
 Tour of Gallipoli in Gallipoli, Çanakkale Province
 Tour of Isparta in Isparta (since 2011)
 Tour of Marmara in Marmara Region (since 2010)
 Mersin Road Cycling Race in Mersin (since 2012)
 Tour of Trakya in Tekirdağ, East Thrace (since 2010)
 Tour of Victory, western Turkey

as well as 
 Turkish National Road Race Championships
 Turkish National Time Trial Championships

Other events are:
 Adana MTB Cup
 Tour of Mevlana
 Tour of Sivas
 Tour of Trabzon.

References

External links
 Turkish Cycling Federation official website

National members of the European Cycling Union
Cycle racing organizations
Cycling
Sports organizations established in 1923
Organizations based in Ankara
Federation
1923 establishments in Turkey